This is a list of games featured on BBC Radio 4's long-running "antidote to panel games", I'm Sorry I Haven't a Clue. Some are featured more frequently than others.

Ad-Lib Poetry
The host gives a line of a poem, and each panelist has to continue the poem, continuing to speak until a buzzer sounds, at which point it goes to the next panelist.  Tim Brooke-Taylor is reported to have expressed a strong hatred for this game.

Backwards
A song is played backwards, and the panelist has to guess what the song is.

The Bad-Tempered Clavier
Panellists attempt to sing a song perfectly in tune while Colin Sell plays wrong notes, changes key and changes tempo. The name is a play on The Well-Tempered Clavier, and the game is identical to an exercise used by the father of the composer Charles Ives to train his son. Points are deducted from players who attempt to sing with their fingers in both ears.

Blues
Each team has to improvise a blues song on a topic given by the other team, such as the "Trichologist's blues" or the "Kerry Packer blues". The songs invariably started with "I woke up this morning". The only exception was when one team had to sing the "I couldn't get to sleep last night blues".

A variation was to improvise a madrigal or a calypso. The calypsos invariably started with "I [something relating to the topic] the other day".

Board-o
Panellists play a board game on the radio. It combines features of the UK edition of Monopoly, Scrabble, Trivial Pursuit, Operation, Jenga, chess, and solitaire, among others.

Call My Bluff
A variation on the TV series Call My Bluff in which panellists all invent bluff definitions of words. However, unlike the original version, in which participants had to define obscure words, in the ISIHAC version, players had to define common words such as "porcupine". The winner was the "most convincing and least embarrassing".

Censored Song
Panelists, in teams of two, are given perfectly innocuous songs; the objective is to make the song as suggestive as possible by the strategic censoring (via a buzzer) of innocent words. For example, "I Whistle a Happy Tune" was censored to become "Whenever I feel a [buzz] / I hold my [buzz] erect / And whistle a happy tune / so no one will suspect I'm a [buzz]". Sometimes the game is played by having one team sing the song and the other buzz; alternatively, the teams are given the original recording to buzz.

Extreme examples include Cryer and Garden's rendition of "My Favourite Things" ("[buzz-buzz] and [buzz-buzz] and [buzz-buzz] and [buzz-buzz], / [buzz-buzz] and [buzz-buzz] and [buzz-buzz] and [buzz-buzz], / [buzz-buzz-buzz-buzz-buzz], tied up with strings: / these are a few of my favourite things"), "All Through the Night" (all words buzzed out except for "All through the night") and "Walking in the Air" from The Snowman (many instances of "I'm [buzz]ing...").

The game saw a brief revival in an episode broadcast in January 2016, with Cryer and Rob Brydon singing censored medleys, with Cryer's medley incorporating "It's Not Unusual", "The Girl from Ipanema" and "I've Got You Under My Skin" ("I've got you under my [buzz], I've got you deep in the [buzz] of me, so deep in my [buzz] that you're really a [buzz-buzz-buzz]..."), while Brydon's medley included "I'm Into Something Good", "Feed the Birds" ("[buzz] the birds, tuppence a [buzz]...") and "We Will Rock You".

The game was left in abeyance after Barry Cryer and his partner played the supreme example, which would never be bettered. This was a rendition of "Grandfather's Clock". It only required one buzz and the innuendo lasted for the whole of the rest of the song.
"Grandfather's [buzz] was too large for the shelf, so it stood 60 years on the floor..."

The game may be based on a recurring sketch from I'm Sorry I'll Read That Again in which songs by Rolf Harris (22 March 1970 episode), Tom Jones (5 April 1970 episode), and Julie Andrews (26 April 1970 episode) were "censored" (for example, "Two little boys had two little [buzz], each had a wooden [buzz]").

Channel 5 Children's Hour
From the early days of Channel 5, when the station was notorious for transmitting mild pornography early in the morning. The panellists are asked to imagine how the channel would treat a variety of children's programmes. Previously called Channel 4 Children's Hour.

Cheddar Gorge
The panelists take turns to say a word each, the ostensible object being to avoid completing a sentence: each word must leave the possibility of the sentence being completed in a grammatically correct and meaningful manner. When a complete sentence has been formed, the player who added the final word is eliminated. Play continues with the remaining players starting a new sentence. The last player left is the winner.

Often, the chairman will assign a word for each player to insert into the sentence. For example, in one game the teams had to tell the story of Goldilocks and the Three Bears, with Tim Brooke-Taylor having to fit in the word "stethoscope", Graeme Garden "iPad", Marcus Brigstocke "Brazilian" and Barry Cryer "porridge". These words were often shoehorned in regardless of the sentence structure, leading to much laughter from the audience.

As is usually the case on I'm Sorry I Haven't A Clue, the game is not played seriously. The sentence ending rule is largely ignored, and the end of the sentence is declared almost entirely arbitrarily by Lyttleton sounding his horn. The sentences constructed are always long and unwieldy, and the panelists play for laughs on several levels. The sentences are often nonsensical, including as many silly turns of phrase as possible. If a panellist is stuck, they will often say "comma". During one game, guest panelist Bill Bailey received a laugh for using the phrase "Open brackets".

The origin of the game's name is obscure. Lyttleton often commented that it clearly outlines the game's principles, and mentioned other games named after geographic features or cheeses.

In recent series, the game has been replaced with "Letter Writing". However, it was played by Jack Dee and Jeremy Hardy in the Christmas special Humph in Wonderland, and has been sporadically played since series 55.

Ciryl
This game, one of the many singing rounds on the programme, encourages the panel to sing a song backwards, such as "Adorable, you're A" or "Better Do Can I, Do Can You Anything". Indeed, the name Ciryl is "lyric" spelt backwards. Panelists usually take one line each and sing the words the correct way round, but in reverse order.

The game is introduced as having occurred to Lyttleton when he was walking through Finsbury Park, which he refers to as "Krapy Rub Snif".

Complete Bellocs
In this game, Jack Dee reads the first two lines of a rhyming couplet telling a cautionary tale in the style of Hilaire Belloc, for each team member to complete. These are usually completed with another couplet, but occasionally carry on a bit longer.

Cow, Lake, Bomb
A variation of Rock, Paper, Scissors, using sound effects. Each team must select a sound effect (from a moo, a splash, and an explosion). The rules say that "Cow drinks lake, lake extinguishes bomb, bomb blows up cow". The game almost always ends up being abandoned as the teams play their sound effects, and Lyttleton or Dee failing to distinguish which team played which, and soon degenerating into the teams playing masses of sound effects on top of each other.

Other variants of this game are Cat, Duck, Splash, where "cat eats duck, duck floats on water, water drowns cat", and Match, Canary, Fart, where "a match lights a fart, canary eats a match and a fart gasses a canary."

DIY Drama
This round requires the teams to improvise an episode of a drama series in a specific genre. Genres seen so far include soap opera, science fiction, costume drama and detective fiction. Scene-setting sound effects are used to make the improvisation more difficult.

Double Feature
This round takes as its premise the poverty of the international film industry, for economic reasons new films are being remade as combinations of two or more old films. For example, remaking High Noon with E.T. and calling it High Tea. This kind of economy was taken to an extreme with The Magnificent Seven Dwarves for Seven Samurai. The game frequently strayed into television, a notable example being Tim saying the makers of Three of a Kind, The Odd Couple and One Man and His Dog provide the audience for Channel 4.

Common variations on the game include merging two or more television shows, plays or novels. Another variation was to make cuts to films, novels, plays or television shows to reflect economic conditions, e.g., One Foot in the Grave becomes One Inch in the Grave, Lady Chatterley's Lover becomes Lady Chatterley's Penpal and Bring Me the Head of Alfredo Garcia becomes Bring Me the Hat of Alfredo Garcia. In later shows the literary variation was announced as "Wuthering Hillocks".

Dysfunctional Duets
Similar to "The Singer and the Song", except that one member of the team sings the song "straight", and the other responds to each line. Examples include "Underneath the Arches", sung by Flannagan and Alan Whicker (in which Willie Rushton as Whicker is unable to comprehend the existence of a poor person) and "Puff the Magic Dragon" by Peter, Paul and Mary Whitehouse (in which Sandi Toksvig as Whitehouse found double entendres in every line). One notable round had Brooke-Taylor singing "Won't You Come Home Bill Bailey", with Bill Bailey responding as "himself".

Famous First Words
The panelists suggest famous first words of famous people.  An example is that Tim Brooke-Taylor commented that Magnus Magnusson's first words were "I've started, so I'll finish."

Good News, Bad News
One panellist gives a piece of good news, another gives a corresponding piece of bad news, then the next gives good news and so on. For example: "Good news, the Russians are putting a Briton into space", "Bad news, it's not Jeffrey Archer", "The good news is that it is Robert Maxwell", "Bad news, he's going to nobble the Sky satellite", "Good news, he'll succeed".

Each cycle continues until the host presses a buzzer or makes a different sound.

Historical Headlines
The chairman identifies a historical event, such as the assassination of Julius Caesar, and invites the panellists to suggest the headlines that would be used by modern newspapers reporting on the event. Panellists make their suggestions in no particular order, leading to a fluid style of play.

This game works well because of the United Kingdom's remarkable profusion of newspapers, representing many styles and viewpoints. The round uses caricatures, and often stereotypes, of the papers' views, such as the Daily Mails obsession with property values (e.g.: "William the Conqueror Invades England; House Prices Slump in SE"), the Daily Express and its obsession with asylum seekers, The Guardians reputation for bad spelling, the Sunday Sports regular reporting of sightings of Elvis, and the Evening Standards single-minded concentration on London-centric news, often concerning a tube strike.

Other local newspapers can be used to give a parochial slant on an item. In the case of the death of Julius Caesar, the Lancashire Evening Posts headline (enunciated in lugubrious northern tones) was, "Mark Antony comes to Bury."

Hunt the Slipper
One of the few games in which Lyttleton participated. He explains that, once blindfolded by Samantha, he must determine which panellist has the slipper. When he is ready, he cries "Slipper search on!" before making his decision, pointing to a panellist, and declaring "Slipper holder". Unfortunately, none of the panellists had been informed that they needed to bring a slipper, and the game was abandoned.

Identify the Joke
In this round, Colin Sell starts playing a song, which is a clue to a joke which Jack Dee has on his card. The teams' job is to buzz in, identify the song and tell a joke relating to the song. If everyone has incorrectly guessed the joke, Colin then proceeds to play another song as another clue. This continues until the joke has been correctly identified, or no one guesses correctly after three songs have been played, in which case Jack will tell the correct joke instead.

Jigsaw
Panellists try to complete a jigsaw puzzle, mainly in silence. Occasional comments are heard, such as "Is that an edge?" "No, it's a bush." There are also moments when the noise of players trying to pound a piece into place by brute force is audible.

Just a Minim
A parody of Just a Minute, in which the contestants have to sing a song "without repetition, deviation, hesitation, anthrax or, er...repetition". The songs are chosen for having extremely repetitive lyrics (for instance "Old McDonald Had a Farm" or "This Ole House"), causing the contestants to have to think up ingenious synonyms. In the "Old McDonald" version, when Cryer used a variety of alternative turkey noises, Rushton challenged for failing to say "gobble" at all. Another time, Brooke-Taylor challenged for the repetition of the word 'I', which Lyttleton dismissed saying 'I' was too short. When it was Rushton's turn, he said 'I' in place of every word. The panellists often audibly struggle to stay within the rules; in many early playings of the game, a favourite tactic, especially of Graeme Garden, was to sing the chosen song 'straight' in the hopes of being challenged (and therefore relieved from the chore of singing).

Jack Dee has added to the game since he began chairing by mimicking Nicholas Parsons's overenthusiastic speech style, overly congratulating the players for every challenge, the game itself "which is beloved across the cosmos", and paying respect "to Darth Vader who created this game."  He will sometimes talk at such length that the panellist, when finally asked what his challenge was, says "I've forgotten".

Karaoke-Cokey
The Plasma Display Board (upgraded from the old laser display screen) shows the name of a well known song, which the audience must hum, following an unrelated piano introduction from Colin Sell. Panellists simply have to identify the song. The fun of this song comes from the audience's self-conscious attempts to remain in time, often obscuring the song completely. The audience is left to its own devices regarding when to begin, and which part of the song to do. Most memorably, the audience once had to give a rendition of "Funky Gibbon", a hit for The Goodies, of which Graeme Garden and Tim Brooke-Taylor were members. Another notable round was recorded in Leeds, Yorkshire, where the tune was Flight of the Bumblebee; for this, instead of humming the tune, the whole audience simply buzzed and Graeme Garden guessed "Flight of the Warthog".

The game was played during the live tour, but the audience were all given kazoos through which to hum the tunes given to them, thus hampering the Teams even more.

Kazoo Pipes 
Panellists are tasked with recreating the sounds and songs of the bagpipes with kazoos (including drone and melody.) A notable recording in Glasgow featured 1000 kazoos in the audience playing along to the tune of Amazing Grace, helping out panellists Susan Calman (on drone) and Tony Hawks (with the main melody.)

Last Episode
The object was to "put the last nail in the coffin of a long-running radio or television show and close the series in one line". For example, Rushton concluded Thunderbirds with "Brains says it's terminal Dutch elm disease" and Brooke-Taylor concluded The Two Ronnies with "It's goodnight from me, and it's goodnight from her".

A variation involved unexpected or premature endings to well-known plays or films. Graeme obliged with "Godot! I wasn't expecting you so soon."

Late Arrivals (at a society ball)
Until recently, the closing round was often "Late Arrivals at the such-and-such Ball" which descends directly from frequent incidental dialogue included in the earlier, scripted BBC Radio 4 series I'm Sorry, I'll Read That Again. Late arrivals at the Drunkards' Ball could for example include Mr and Mrs Large-Whisky and their son Oliver (a pun on "I'll have a large whisky"). Adjectives were often used very effectively to qualify attendees' names, for example at the Bankers' Ball, "Mr and Mrs Dingrates, and their debauched son, Base Len".

The names did not have to follow this format. The Politicians' Ball famously gave rise to: "Announcing the late arrival of... the Marquis de Sade and the party whips". A phrase which invariably provoked applause was, "It's Cabaret time!", followed by the name of a fictitious group or entertainer.

One running joke (usually by Graeme Garden) is the appearance of Mr and Mrs Bennett - (Long phrase of exclamation relevant to the subject) - and their son Gordon, the joke being that this is an easy cop-out (e.g., at the Builders' Ball, Mr and Mrs Bennett-That's-Twice-The-Estimate...) which plays on the once-popular exclamation of surprise "Gordon Bennett".

After the chairman has identified the ball, the panellists announce the late arrivals, in no particular order. Play is fast and fluid, often to the point that the chairman cannot end the show without shouting over the teams. One favourite from a very early show featured Lyttleton butting-in with:
"Ladies and Gentlemen, kindly SHUT UP for Mr and Mrs N-why-I-must-interrupt-is-that-we've-overstepped-the-bounds-of-decency-and-also-reached-the-end-of-the-series, and their daughter - Theresa!"

Letter Writing / Eighty-Four Chicken Cross Road
A development of Cheddar Gorge in which the teams improvise an exchange of letters between two famous persons, past or present, fictional or real, with each team composing one of the letters and with the two members of that team constrained to compose it by alternating one word at a time. This generally leads to letters developing in amusingly bizarre or lewd directions for which no one player can take full credit, and allows players to enjoy putting their teammates in awkward situations, for example by throwing in strings of conjunctions and adverbs to force their partner to keep supplying nouns and adjectives.  An early name for the round, "84 Chicken Cross Road," has come back into regular use as the round's title; it is apparently a blend of 84, Charing Cross Road and "Why did the chicken cross the road?"

Limericks
In this game, which has not been played on the programme for several years, the chairman supplies the first line of a limerick, and the four panellists each improvise a line in turn to complete it. Usually four rounds are played, rotating the panellists so that they each get a turn supplying each possible line.

This is the most serious of the games, in the sense that its ostensible object (to create a funny poem on the spot) is precisely the actual object for which the panellists are aiming. The game is a test of comedic and improvisational skill, and is difficult to do well. Out of four rounds, the ISIHAC panellists typically produce one or two really good limericks, with the remainder still being creditable. The audience especially applauded instances of players inventing rhymes which avoided obvious obscenities :

A small breed of dog is the Scotty
It's house-trained and uses a potty
He gives a loud "Yap!"
That mischievous chap
Then gets up and wipes his wee botty

A book containing a collection of the best limericks was published in 1999 as I'm Sorry I Haven't a Clue: The Official Limerick Collection.

Medical Complaints
In this game, each team is given a medical condition to act out (which is also displayed to the audience on the laser display board) for the other team to guess. Symptoms have included Barry and Graeme thinking they are a man with two heads, Tim and Pippa Evans thinking that they are the M25, and Barry and Jo Brand thinking they are sound engineers on a BBC period costume drama, so they began mumbling inaudibly (a satirical nod to the controversy over the inaudible dialogue of the BBC's then-recent adaptations of Jamaica Inn and SS-GB).

Mornington Crescent

This is by far the best-known ISIHAC game. Ostensibly it is an obscure game of extreme complexity, involving the naming of London Underground stations (or, sometimes, other London areas, roads, landmarks etc.) in convoluted patterns not readily discernible by the observer. A summary of the "rules" can be found in the main Mornington Crescent article. It is a very popular game for fans of the show to play themselves.

An attempt was once made to play Mornington Crescent in Slough, rather than London. The game came to an abrupt end when Willie Rushton pointed out to Lyttleton that there was no Mornington Crescent in Slough.  Game play is often preceded by the reading out of a "letter from Mrs Trellis of North Wales" in which Mrs Trellis writes, usually to a random celebrity, to ask a ridiculous question or make an incoherent comment.

Name That Barcode
Lyttleton reads aloud a barcode, and panellists attempt to guess what product the barcode comes from. For example, Lyttleton will read out some variation on “Thick black, thin white, thin black, thin white very thick black” etc.; while panellists will usually suggest various joke products (such as a gadget enabling the user to see behind them while in church – a rear pew mirror).

Name That Motorway
A clip is played of traffic passing, and panellists must figure out the motorway where it was recorded. As with Name That Barcode, the humour derives from the panellists’ pretence that the game can be played seriously.

A variant of this game is "Name That Author", where the teams have to guess a famous author from the sounds of a typewriter, computer keyboard or pen being used.

Name That Silence
Panellists listen to several seconds of silence, and try to determine the origin of the silence. Answers range from Jade Goody appearing on Mastermind, to an audience's reaction to a Bill Oddie nature programme or the Radio 4 continuity announcer falling asleep during Quote, Unquote.

The game is also known as Dead Air.

One Song to the Tune of Another
In One Song to the Tune of Another, panellists sing the lyrics of a song to the tune of a completely different one. The simple idea is always 'explained' to the audience with an incomprehensibly elaborate and bizarre analogy which ends in complete confusion, and often a dig at Colin Sell.

This is the epitome of inherently silly games, though to perform it without preparation can still involve a fair bit of skill. A laugh can be raised purely by Lyttleton's announcement of the two compositions, especially if they are from wildly differing genres: e.g., The Undertones' "Teenage Kicks" to the tune of "Jerusalem".

It was the very first game played by the teams on the very first episode of ISIHAC, back in April 1972.

Opera Time
Panellists turn a bland piece of prose, such as the instructions for a board game or the installation manual for a hot water heater, into grand operatic duets. This often included operatic maniacal laughter between lines. A similar version of this game can be found in The 99p Challenge, another Radio 4 panel game, which draws heavily on ISIHAC's influence.

Paranoia
One team suffers from a delusion but they don't know what it is (the mystery delusion is revealed to the other team and the audience by the Laser Display Board and the Mystery Voice). They ask questions of the other panel to find out the mystery delusion. Examples of delusions include "They think the King's Singers want to kill them" or "They think they are Jason Donovan".

A variant of this is called Scandals, where the teams have to guess which scandal they are embroiled in. For example, Tim Brooke-Taylor and Jeremy Hardy had to guess they'd been implicated in the cash for honours scandal, and Barry Cryer and Graeme Garden had a worse indignity of having to guess they'd accepted a booking for Quote, Unquote. This led to Brooke-Taylor asking Cryer and Garden if they'd "given up on comedy".

Pick-up Song
The panellist sings along to a well-known song. The sound of the song is turned off for a period while the panellist continues to sing. The aim is to be as close as possible to the original when it's turned on again. This round is rarely included on the BBC Radio Collection CDs of the series, owing to reproduction rights on the original recordings. It appeared on CD for the first time on the 2008 release I'm Sorry I Haven't A Clue Live 2.

Along with Mornington Crescent and Sound Charades, this is one of the games where the introduction has acquired a life of its own, and is the only segment in which points are discussed by Lyttleton, who promises to award points to anyone who is "Within a gnat's crotchet" or "a midge's minim". He then recites Bruce Forsyth's catchphrase from Play Your Cards Right: "Points mean prizes – what do points mean?", to which the audience yells, "Prizes!" As time has moved on, Lyttleton has begun to replace "prizes" with more elaborate descriptions ("Points mean surprises", "Points mean sumptuous extravagant prizes", or "Points mean the junctions on railway lines"). When asked "What do points mean?", some of the audience responds by shouting what Lyttleton has just said, and the rest shout "Prizes!" regardless. Alternatives include "Pets Win Prizes, what do pets win?", and "I've seen prizes, what have I seen?". (On one occasion, the line became "Points mean prizes – what does moronic bellowing mean?" The audience obligingly roared, "Prizes!") In a 2007 episode, Lyttleton began the usual introduction, before interrupting with "what we used to do, in the old days, was I then said something about points being awarded, and I used to say 'What do points mean?' (Audience obligingly roars "Prizes!") But we don't do that anymore"; and on another occasion, he responded to the roar of "Prizes!" by telling the audience to "go off and invade Czechoslovakia."

Prizes include such luxury items as a reptile that wakes you up in the morning (an alarm croc) or lawn seed to help make your garden look bigger (magnifying grass).

In the game itself, the panel, and in some cases the audience, participate in some of the musical renditions. As few of the participants can really sing, the round can have additional humour value. However, the applause when someone actually comes close to keeping up with the original song is clearly a genuine recognition of achievement. Rob Brydon's ability to mimic Tom Jones and to keep up exactly with his song "Delilah" on the Monday 26 June 2006 programme received one of the loudest and longest ovations in the programme's recent history. Despite playing the game to perfection, Lyttleton nonetheless failed to award Brydon any points. On one occasion when Barry Cryer kept up exactly, despite having broken into fits of giggles halfway through, he was told by Lyttleton "In snooker, it's usual to apologise for a fluke."

In the last episode of the 2006 series helium was used to aid Tony Hawks in impersonating Pinky and Perky, and Brooke-Taylor in impersonating Ann Stephens. When the sound was brought up on the Ann Stephens recording, however, the needle turned out to be stuck. In the same episode, Garden was asked to sing along to "I Don't Feel Like Dancin'" by Scissor Sisters.  Garden's son John "JJ" Garden performs occasionally with the group at live gigs.

A variation on this game, announced as "Radioke" (a combination of radio and karaoke), was for panellists to read along to a radio recording such as a wartime speech by Winston Churchill or the football results by James Alexander Gordon.

On a few rare occasions it was found that, when the song was faded back in, the record had in fact moved onto the next track.

The panelists are far more likely to be too fast than too slow.

Pin the Tail on Colin Sell
Based on Pin the Tail on the Donkey, panellists are challenged to pin a tail on pianist Colin Sell. This translates on radio to several minutes of Sell playing tunes on the piano, before shrieking in pain as the tail is pinned on him. Declared by Lyttleton to be one of his favourite games, adding, "Next time, maybe we’ll try it with a blindfold."

Quote... Misquote (formerly Complete Quotes or Closed Quotes)
In this game the teams are given the beginning of a quotation from a famous person or a passage from a book, and must complete it. The answer they come up with is always humorous, and usually a comment on the person quoted. For instance, Lyttleton once introduced this round with the famous quote "I have in my hand a piece of paper...", finished with "Will someone pass another roll under the door please?" The game was later named "Quote... Misquote" as a parody of the genuine Radio 4 quotation game Quote... Unquote.  Lyttleton will sometimes say that points are deducted for correct answers.

A variation is for players to complete local sayings, song lyrics, snatches of poetry, public notices (e.g., at airports or railway stations), instructions (e.g., on domestic appliances or medicine bottles) or proverbs:
 Lyttleton: "A fool and his money are ..."; Garden: "...welcome at Lloyds"
 Lyttleton: "Rome wasn't built in ..."; Rushton: "Norway"
 Lyttleton: "Once bitten ..."; Rushton: "...twice licked, that's enough of the foreplay"

A later variation was for a recording of a famous personality to be played and stopped in mid sentence. Players then completed the sentence. For example, a recording of John Major: "I go whenever I can, which isn't as often as I would wish. But really I..."; Garden: "...can thoroughly recommend Ex-Lax".

In one 2006 episode the game was retitled "Incomplete Sentences", and said to be "based on an idea by the Home Secretary".

Singing Relay
A team sings a well known song with each panellist singing alternate words. The winner is the team that best keeps in time with the piano. The task is difficult at the best of times; it was often reduced to hilarity by Lyttleton's selection of songs such as "Chitty Chitty Bang Bang".

It was played again in 2006, introduced as It's A Four Part Singing Relay Knockout Competition Game Sans Frontier. This time, all four panellists had to sing a song one word at a time. Panellists were eliminated for long pauses or for coming in too early or at Lyttleton's whim, which lead to Jeremy Hardy doing his words on "Run Rabbit Run" alone.

Sound Charades
In Sound Charades, a team of two panellists is given the title of a book, film, or other artistic work, and they must communicate it to the other team by means of acting out a very short improvised play. Usually the title to be communicated is a contorted pun on the central object in the play, which has (of course) not been explicitly named but only described indirectly. For example, the film Zulu has been acted out by a whispered question being answered with directions that pass several animal enclosures – the questioner has been given directions to the 'zoo loo'. Another example: for Dirty Harry, the entire clue went

'Potter!' (as in Harry Potter)

'Sir?'

'Don't do that' (reference to famous Joyce Grenfell catch-phrase)

The game also provides Lyttleton with the regular opportunity to make fun of Lionel Blair, long-standing team captain on Give Us a Clue, the TV show from which Sound Charades is said to have been derived. This usually involves some sort of outrageous innuendo such as "Who wouldn't have been moved to watch the tears of frustration well up in Lionel's eyes at being unable to use his mouth to finish off Two Gentlemen of Verona?". Una Stubbs, another regular captain on Give Us a Clue, is also occasionally mocked in this way, for example when Lyttleton recalled "the occasion on which Una Stubbs, her hands a blur, managed to pull off Three Men in a Boat in under ninety seconds". However, despite its association with Give Us a Clue, and its seeming divergence from the actual rules of Charades, the game is actually a much older and more obscure version of Charades in which speaking was allowed.

Barry Cryer and Graeme Garden often tell their story as two elderly Scottish gentlemen, Hamish and Dougal. It is in essence a minute-long improvised sketch where each performer knows the other well enough to be able to set up joint jokes seamlessly. Each sketch is started with the line "You'll have had your tea", with which (un)welcome visitors who have a habit of dropping in at dinnertime are reputed to be greeted in Edinburgh, Scotland. (In Scotland and the north of England, the evening meal, typically called dinner in the south, is usually called tea; this can sometimes lead to confusion.) This is done either to deter scroungers or because the person in question is quite tight-fisted himself. A spin-off on BBC Radio Four, You'll Have Had Your Tea, gave the two characters their own series.

One occasion saw a team come to the end of their "four-word" charade, only for Lyttleton to pipe up "It's The Last of the Mohicans: that's five words," thus giving away the answer. In a 2012 episode, Jeremy Hardy correctly guessed Skyfall before the charade had actually started; Cryer and Garden proceeded to play out the charade anyway.

Stars in Their Ears (formerly The Singer and the Song)
Panellists sing a popular song in the style of a famous personality, such as a politician or television presenter. For example, "Wannabe" in the style of John Prescott, "Sisters" in the style of The Queen and Princess Margaret or "Hallelujah" in the style of George Formby. The combination of singer and song is sometimes chosen for superficial appropriateness (as with "Sisters") or lack thereof (as with "My Favourite Things" performed by Darth Vader); sometimes because the song emphasises (or is impeded by) the vocal mannerisms of the subject (as with "Wannabe"); and sometimes simply as a play on names (for instance "What a Wonderful World" as performed by Neil Armstrong, rather than Louis Armstrong, or Queen's "We Are the Champions" as performed by the Queen).

One memorable moment occurred when Willie Rushton had to sing "Jerusalem" as Eartha Kitt, and halfway through he launched into an impression of Orson Welles before interspersing some of "Santa Baby" into the song. Following the end of his song, Lyttleton declared that he couldn't give Rushton any points as he "didn't know what he was doing".

The game title "Stars in Their Ears", used in later series, is a play on Stars in Their Eyes.

Straight Face
In this game, panellists in turn announce words, and the audience is used to judge whether the word is funny. If the audience laughs, "even the merest hint of a titter", then the player who provided the offending word is eliminated. Often, the chairman will ignore words that produce enormous laughs, but will eliminate players whose words produce a barely audible laugh. The last player remaining wins. Lyttleton often noted that, as a game in which the players must avoid making the audience laugh, Barry Cryer has a huge advantage. Indeed, it has been claimed that Cryer has spent most of his life practising this game.

It is possible to predict quite accurately which words will raise a laugh. Arguably this is because some words are inherently funny. Panellists actually take quite daring risks, skating the line between boring and funny words at the risk of elimination. This game can thus be played in a manner that involves considerable comedic skill, not only in judging inherent funniness but also in reading the audience and adjusting the timing and delivery of the word to get the intended effect. It can be viewed as stand-up comedy minus the jokes. One of Lyttelton's favourite memories is from this game when "as only he could, Stephen Fry brought the house down with 'moistly.

In the first episode of the autumn 2006 series, the panellists had to give the punchlines of jokes, with the laughs being inspired either because the audience knew them, or if not, their imaginations provided amusing scenarios.

After Jack Dee took over as chairman, the game was brought back initially as Sausages, then In My Pants. The aim of this variant was that whatever the panelists said had to be answered by Dee with "Sausages" or completed with "...in my pants", in order to make him laugh, earning panelists "bonus points".

Swanee-Kazoo
This is a musical game, and the game yielding by far the most bizarre sounds, thus making excellent radio. It is also inherently silly. As with most of the musical games, the panellists play in teams of two. One player is issued with a swanee whistle, and the other a kazoo. The kazoo is easy to play well, but the whistle takes some skill to produce a melody. Using these, they perform a well-known song as a duet.

The humour principally derives from the sound of the instruments. Both have a characteristically absurd timbre, and the juxtaposition of the two is quite incongruous. Furthermore, the swanee whistle is not usually considered a melody instrument, more usually being employed for special effects (such as the voices of the Clangers). Typically, the kazoo player can hold the tune, thus keeping the performance together, while the swanee whistle produces a deranged version, often only hitting the right note by accident. It is typical, therefore, for the swanee whistle player to take the bulk of the performance.

Possibly the most extensive use of the swanee whistle was the last in the summer 2006 series, where it was used almost exclusively to perform the melody for "Tequila", the kazoo (played by Barry Cryer) being used to supply the "Tequila!"

Tag Wrestling
The chairman gives each team a convoluted punchline, to which they must improvise an equally convoluted joke. However, once the first team has started telling their joke, the chairman will sound his buzzer at random intervals; at this point, the second team must take over, steering the story towards their punchline... until the chairman sounds his buzzer and the first team once more takes over the story, and so on.

Themed Film/Book Club
The chairman identifies a special interest group and invites the panellists to suggest films or books that would be of interest to it. The titles suggested are mostly modifications of well-known film/book titles to create a themed pun, thus the builders' book club might feature "Grout Expectations", a pun on Great Expectations. Some of the suggestions are more elaborate, including puns on the author's name or explanations of their topicality. As with the other common final rounds, the suggestions are made in no particular order. For unknown reasons, the film variant of this game nearly always features a reference to Bring Me the Head of Alfredo Garcia (e.g. at the Gardeners' Film Club, "Bring Me the Shed...", or in the Golfer's Film Club, "Bring Me the Wedge..."), invariably uttered by Graeme Garden.

Other variants of this game include themed songbooks (using song titles, where Barry Cryer will almost invariably come up with some variation on Supercalifragilisticexpialidocious) and Radio Times (with radio and television programmes). In the latter, any version of I'm Sorry I Haven't a Clue itself is, of course, guaranteed to produce a round of applause.

In the second episode of the 51st series, a new variant was played, in which the panellists named various speciality shops.

Trail of the Lonesome Pun
The panelists come up with trailers for different radio and television programmes which have been commissioned solely on the basis of having a pun in the title. For example, Brooke-Taylor trailed a documentary presented by former cricket umpire Dickie Bird lamenting the decline of the full toss and beamer bowling moves, titled Nobody Gives a Toss.

Uxbridge English Dictionary (formerly New Definitions)
The panellists must suggest alternative definitions for existing English words. For example, "lymph" has been redefined as "to walk with a lisp", or crackerjack has been said to be "a device for lifting biscuits". During one round of the game, Stephen Fry suggested that 'countryside' should mean 'to kill Piers Morgan'. The game has recently been renamed Uxbridge English Dictionary to tie in with a book of that title collecting the definitions made in the round. The game is known outside of ISIHAC as "daffynitions", and bears a strong similarity to the entries from the fictional Dictionary for Today that occasionally featured in Beachcomber, as well as Douglas Adams and John Lloyd's whimsical dictionary of redefined place-names, The Meaning of Liff.

An early variation of the game required new definitions for foreign terms or phrases which have become common in English. Graeme Garden memorably redefined "apres-ski" as "plaster of paris" or, "I've finished the yoghurt".

There is another running joke found in this game, this time by Barry Cryer, by saying how Sean Connery would say something, for example: "pastiche - what Sean Connery eats in Cornwall" (pasties), or "twinge - what Sean Connery calls children of the same age" (twins).

This game considerably predates the foundation of the Roger's Profanisaurus, and both are descended from the concepts behind Ambrose Bierce's Devil's Dictionary in an arc that fans of ISIHAC are likely to consider "literary". For certain, low, values of "literary".

Where Am I?
Lyttleton was blindfolded by Samantha, and the teams play sound effects in an attempt to help him guess a location. Lyttleton's mind tended to wander during this round, or occasionally he fell asleep. Panellists have questioned why Lyttleton insists on being blindfolded for the game.

Word for Word
This is based on word association, an investigative technique in psychology which can be used as a game. In the word association game, players in turn say whatever word comes into their mind first after hearing the previous word. "Word for Word" is a word disassociation game: players may say any word as long as it has no connection whatsoever to the previous word. This is surprisingly difficult to do.

This game produces amazing strings of nonsense. Furthermore, as with the other elimination games, the elimination rule is not strictly followed. Fairly direct links between words are occasionally permitted, but words may be deemed connected based on bizarre and tortuous chains of association. For example, in one episode, a player said "cardigan" and the next "pier". Another then said "Cardigan has a pier" and was corrected: "Cardigan was a peer". One of the next few words was "pullover", and was buzzed because "you can pull over to see Cardigan's pier".

Barry Cryer has a notable tendency to take two consecutively uttered words, such as "skimp" and "leave", put them together and claim that there was a 1960s rock band with this name. For instance, the words "aubergine" and "favourite" were connected thus, in the 30th Anniversary Special, where Cryer then corrected himself, saying it was in fact "Aubergine Vincent". In more recent series, Colin Sell would start playing on the piano, forcing Cryer to improvise a song on the spot based upon the link he had found.

Because connections are allowed between words that are not uttered consecutively, one way to play the game (favoured by Garden) is to say alternate words that are all connected. In one round, Garden and Cryer gave the sequence "shampoo", "dilatory", "conditioner", "fecund", "hair", at which point they were stopped when Tim Brooke-Taylor pointed out that "a hair, out of Graeme, drops off every fecund".

A running joke established in recent series is that Graeme Garden, when told that it is his turn, would reply "me?" When Jack Dee confirms "yes", Garden would say "That was my word." This is sometimes followed up: the next time Garden is told it is his turn, he would say "again?" Upon being told "yes", he would again explain that that was his word.

References

I'm Sorry I Haven't a Clue
I'm Sorry I Haven't a Clue